The Alleyn Baronetcy, of Hatfield in the County of Essex, was a title in the Baronetage of England. It was created on 24 June 1629 for Edward Alleyn. The title became extinct on the death of the eighth Baronet in 1759.

Alleyn baronets, of Hatfield (1629)
 Sir Edward Alleyn, 1st Baronet (–1638)
 Sir Edmund Alleyn, 2nd Baronet (c. 1632–1656)
 Sir Edmund Alleyn, 3rd Baronet (died c. 1658)
 Sir George Alleyn, 4th Baronet (died 1664)
 Sir George Alleyn, 5th Baronet (died 1702)
 Sir Clopton Alleyn, 6th Baronet (died 1726)
 Sir George Alleyn, 7th Baronet (died c. 1746)
 Sir Edmund Alleyn, 8th Baronet (died 1759)

See also
 Alen baronets
 Allan baronets
 Allen baronets
 Alleyne baronets
 Allin baronets

Notes

Extinct baronetcies in the Baronetage of England